Apophthisis is a genus of moths in the family Gracillariidae.

Species
Apophthisis congregata Braun, 1923
Apophthisis pullata Braun, 1915

External links
Global Taxonomic Database of Gracillariidae (Lepidoptera)

Gracillariinae
Gracillarioidea genera